Foleyella is a genus of nematodes belonging to the family Onchocercidae.

The species of this genus are found in North America.

Species:

Foleyella convoluta 
Foleyella furcata
Foleyella scalaris 
Foleyella vellardi

References

Nematodes